Bruceantin is a chemical compound that was first isolated from the plant Brucea antidysenterica in 1973.  Chemically, it is classified as a secotriterpenoid and a quassinoid.

Bucreantin has attracted interest as a potential antitumor drug because of its antineoplastic activity. It inhibits the peptidyl transferase elongation reaction, resulting in decreased protein and DNA synthesis. Bruceantin also has antibiotic, antiamoebic, and antimalarial activity.

Phase I and II clinical trials were conducted for the treatment of metastatic breast cancer and malignant melanoma, but tumor regression was not observed and clinical development was terminated.

References

Quassinoids